Sagittaria is a genus of about 30 species of aquatic plants whose members go by a variety of common names, including arrowhead, duck potato, katniss, Omodaka (沢瀉 in Japanese), swamp potato, tule potato, and wapato (or wapatoo). Most are native to South, Central, and North America, but there are also some from Europe, Africa, and Asia.

Description 
Sagittaria plant stock (the perennial rhizome) is a horizontal creeper (stoloniferous) and obliquely obovate, the margins winged, with apical or ventral beak; in other words, they are a small, dry, one-seeded fruit that do not open to release the seed, set on a slant, narrower at the base, with winged edges, and having a "beaked" aperture (one side longer than the other) for sprouting, set above or below the fruit body.

One of the names for this plant is derived from the edible underwater tuber that the plant produces. In late fall or early spring, disturbing the aquatic mud in which the plant grows will cause its small tubers to float to the surface where they can be harvested and then boiled.

Uses 
Many species have edible roots, prized for millennia as a reliable source of starch and carbohydrates, even during the winter. Some are edible raw, though are less bitter when cooked. They can be harvested by hand or by treading with one's feet in the mud. They are easy to propagate by replanting the roots.

Species 

Accepted species:

 Sagittaria aginashii Makino – Japan, Korea, Primorye
 Sagittaria ambigua J.G.Sm. – Missouri Arrowhead – from Oklahoma to Indiana
 Sagittaria australis (J.G.Sm.) Small – Appalachian Arrowhead – southeastern US from Louisiana to Florida and as far north as Iowa and New Jersey
 Sagittaria brevirostra Mack. & Bush – Shortbeak Arrowhead – central US (Great Plains, Mississippi and Ohio Valleys, Great Lakes); also Virginia and Saskatchewan; naturalized in California
 Sagittaria chapmanii (J.G.Sm.) C.Mohr – from Texas to the Carolinas
 Sagittaria cristata Engelm – Crested arrowhead – Great Lakes region
 Sagittaria cuneata E.P.Sheld. – Wapato, Northern Arrowhead, Swamp Potato – most of Canada including Yukon and Northwest Territories; Alaska; western and northeastern US
 Sagittaria demersa J.G.Sm. – Chihuahuan arrowhead – New Mexico, northeastern Mexico
 Sagittaria engelmanniana J.G.Sm. – Engelmann's arrowhead – eastern US from Mississippi to Vermont
 Sagittaria fasciculata E.O.Beal – Bunched Arrowhead – North and South Carolina
 Sagittaria filiformis J.G.Sm. – Threadleaf Arrowhead – eastern US from Alabama to Maine
 Sagittaria graminea Michx. – Grassy Arrowhead, Grass-leaved Arrowhead – Cuba; much of eastern and central US; eastern Canada; naturalized in Washington State and in Vietnam
 Sagittaria guayanensis Kunth – Guyanese Arrowhead – widespread across Latin America, the West Indies, China, India, Southeast Asia; introduced into Louisiana
 Sagittaria intermedia Micheli in A.L.P.P.de Candolle & A.C.P.de Candolle – Greater Antilles, Colombia, southern Mexico
 Sagittaria isoetiformis J.G.Sm. – Quillwort Arrowhead – Cuba, from Florida, Georgia, Alabama, Mississippi, Carolinas
 Sagittaria kurziana Glück – Springtape or Strap-leaf Sagittaria – Florida; naturalized in Mariana Islands
 Sagittaria lancifolia L. – Bulltongue Arrowhead – southeastern US from Texas to Delaware; West Indies; Latin America from southern Mexico to Brazil
 Sagittaria latifolia Willd. – Duck-potato, Broad-leaved Arrowhead, Wapato – widespread across most of North America, the West Indies and northern South America; naturalized in Hawaii, the western Himalayas and parts of Europe
 Sagittaria lichuanensis J.K.Chen, X.Z.Sun & H.Q.Wang – southern China
 Sagittaria longiloba Engelm. ex J.G. Sm. – Longbarb Arrowhead – southern Great Plains, Arizona, New Mexico, California, Mexico, Nicaragua, Venezuela
 Sagittaria × lunata C.D.Preston & Uotila – Sweden, Finland, northern Russia   (S. natans × S. sagittifolia)
 Sagittaria macrocarpa J.G.Sm. – Large-fruited Arrowhead – North and South Carolina
 Sagittaria macrophylla Zucc. – Papa de agua – Mexico
 Sagittaria montevidensis Cham. & Schltdl. – California Arrowhead – widespread across much of US, Mexico and South America
 Sagittaria natans Pall. – widespread across northern Europe and Asia from Sweden to Kamchatka; Russia, China, Kazakhstan, Japan, Korea
 Sagittaria papillosa Buchenau – Nipplebract Arrowhead – Texas, Louisiana, Mississippi, Arkansas, Oklahoma
 Sagittaria planitiana G.Agostini – Brazil, Venezuela
 Sagittaria platyphylla (Engelm.) J.G.Sm. – Delta Arrowhead, Delta Duck-potato – south-central US with scattered populations in southeast, the Ohio Valley and Washington State; also Mexico and Panama; naturalized in South Australia, Italy, Java, Caucasus
 Sagittaria potamogetifolia Merr. – southern China
 Sagittaria pygmaea Miq. – Pygmy arrowhead – China, Japan, Korea, Himalayas, Thailand, Vietnam
 Sagittaria rhombifolia Cham. – Costa Rica; widespread across much of South America
 Sagittaria rigida Pursh. – Canadian Arrowhead – Canada from Quebec to Saskatchewan; common in northeastern and north-central US from Arkansas and Nebraska east to Virginia and New England; scattered populations in California, Idaho, Oregon, and Washington State; naturalised in Great Britain
 Sagittaria sagittifolia L. – Arrowhead – widespread across most of Europe; Siberia, Caucasus, Turkey
 Sagittaria sanfordii Greene – Valley Arrowhead – endemic to California
 Sagittaria secundifolia Kral – Little River Arrowhead – Georgia and Alabama
 Sagittaria sprucei Micheli in A.L.P.P.de Candolle & A.C.P.de Candolle – Colombia, Peru, Venezuela, northern Brazil
 Sagittaria subulata L. Buchenau – Narrow-leaved Arrowhead – eastern US from Louisiana to Massachusetts; naturalized in Great Britain, Azores and Java
 Sagittaria tengtsungensis H.Li – Tibet, Nepal, Bhutan, Yunnan
 Sagittaria teres S.Watson – Slender Arrowhead  – northeastern US
 Sagittaria trifolia L. – Threeleaf Arrowhead – widespread across much of Asia including Siberia, China, Japan, India, Iran, Indonesia, Philippines, etc.; also Ukraine and European Russia; naturalized in Fiji and Polynesia

Formerly placed here
 Echinodorus palaefolius (Nees & Mart.) J.F.Macbr. (as S. palaefolia Nees & Mart.)
 Limnophyton obtusifolium (L.) Miq. (as S. obtusifolia L.)
 Wiesneria triandra (Dalzell) Micheli (as S. triandra Dalzell)

References 

 Rataj, K., Annot. Zool. Bot. (Bratislava) 76:1–31 (1972); 78:1–61 (1972)
 Staff of the L. H. Bailey Hortorium, Hortus Third, pg. 993

External links 

 Plants for a Future
 The Arrowheads
 Edibility of Sagittaria: Identification and edible parts of Sagittaria.

 
Alismataceae genera
Edible plants
Freshwater plants
Root vegetables
Tubers
Plants used in Native American cuisine
Taxa named by Carl Linnaeus